Lucky Thirteen or Lucky 13 may refer to:

Film and television
 Lucky 13, a 2005 romantic comedy film
 "Lucky Thirteen" (House), the fifth episode of the fifth season of the Fox television drama House
 "Lucky 13" (All Grown Up!), an episode and DVD release of the Nickelodeon animated television series All Grown Up!
 "Lucky 13", the thirteenth episode of the Netflix series Love, Death & Robots

Music
 Lucky 13, a 2000 album by Canadian singer Thomas Wade
 Lucky 13, a 2006 album by Australian blues musician Fiona Boyes
 Lucky 13, a 2012 album by American jazz saxophonist Javon Jackson
 Lucky Thirteen (Neil Young album), 1993
 Lucky Thirteen (Bert Jansch album), 1966
 Lucky Thirteen (Vincent album), 2007
 "Lucky 13", a song by The Smashing Pumpkins on the album Machina II/The Friends & Enemies of Modern Music
 "Lucky Thirteen", a song by Cosa Brava from the 2008 album Ragged Atlas
 "Lucky Thirteen", a 1956 song by British singer Frankie Vaughan

Radio stations
 KAGT (90.5 FM), Abilene, Texas
 WAVZ (1300 AM), New Haven, Connecticut
 WLQY (1320 AM), Hollywood, Florida
 WMID, Atlantic City, New Jersey
 WNQM, Nashville, Tennessee
 WTLC (AM), Indianapolis, Indiana

Other uses

 Lucky Thirteen attack, a padding oracle attack against the TLS protocol
 Lucky Thirteen, a photographic series by well-known photographer Philip-Lorca diCorcia
 Lucky 13, a plug or fishing lure developed by James Heddon

See also
 MFC 13: Lucky 13, a 2007 Maximum Fighting Championship event in Edmonton, Alberta, Canada